The IRB Women's Sevens World Series (2012/2013) was the inaugural edition of the IRB Women's Sevens World Series, organized by the IRB annual series of tournaments for women's national teams in the Rugby Sevens.

In October 2012 the IRB announced that the season would consist of four tournaments - in Dubai, Houston, Guangzhou and Amsterdam - played from November 2012 to May 2013. The Dubai tournament was held in conjunction with the 2012 Dubai Sevens for men, while the others were separate competitions. The number of teams in each of the events was set at twelve, with six core teams participating in all tournaments of the series and the other teams identified by elimination or rankings within the IRB's six regions.

Itinerary

The competition
As in the case of male competition series winner will be the team that the entire season will score the most points awarded for winning various places in each event.

Points schedule
The season championship will be determined by points earned in each tournament. The scoring system, similar to that used in the men's IRB Sevens, was announced shortly before the season kicked off.

Cup Winner - 20
Cup Runner Up - 18
3rd Place - 16
Cup Semi Finalist - 14
Plate Winner - 12
Plate Runner Up - 10
Winner 7th/8th play-off - 8
Loser 7th/8th play-off - 6
Bowl Winner - 4
Bowl Runner Up - 3
Winner 11th/12th play-off - 2
Loser 11th/12th play-off - 1

Rankings
Final standings for the 2012–13 series:

Notes:
 These standings did not qualify teams for women's rugby sevens World Series II. Quarterfinalists from 2013 Rugby World Cup Sevens gained core team status for 2013–14.

Season

Round 1: Dubai

Round 2: United States

Round 3: China

Round 4: Netherlands

References

External links
 

 
2012–13
2012 rugby sevens competitions
2013 rugby sevens competitions
2012 in women's rugby union
2013 in women's rugby union